Allotinus nivalis is a butterfly in the family Lycaenidae. It was described by Herbert Druce in 1873. It is found in Southeast Asia.

Subspecies
Allotinus nivalis nivalis (Borneo, Pulo Laut)
Allotinus nivalis felderi Semper, 1889 (Philippines)

References

Butterflies described in 1873
Allotinus
Butterflies of Borneo
Butterflies of Asia
Taxa named by Herbert Druce